Raymond Joseph Deshaies (born September 25, 1961) is an American biochemist and cell biologist.  He is senior vice president of global research at Amgen and a visiting associate at the California Institute of Technology (Caltech).  Prior to that, he was a professor of biology at Caltech and an investigator of the Howard Hughes Medical Institute.  He is also the co-founder of the biotechnology companies Proteolix and Cleave Biosciences.  His research focuses on mechanisms and regulation of protein homeostasis in eukaryotic cells, with a particular focus on how proteins are conjugated with ubiquitin and degraded by the proteasome.

Biography 
Deshaies was born in Waterbury, Connecticut, on September 25, 1961.  He graduated from Cornell University with a B.S. in biochemistry in 1983.  He received his biochemistry doctorate from the University of California, Berkeley, in 1988.  He performed postdoctoral studies at Berkeley (1988–1990) and subsequently at the University of California, San Francisco (1990–1994).  He started as an assistant professor at Caltech in 1994 and was promoted to associate professor in 2000 and professor in 2005.  In 2000, he was appointed as an assistant investigator of the Howard Hughes Medical Institute, and held the title of investigator from 2004–2017.  He co-founded the biotechnology companies Proteolix and Cleave Biosciences in 2003 and 2011, respectively.  He also founded the Proteome Exploration Laboratory at Caltech in 2006.

Scientific contributions 
Protein translocation:  As a graduate student and postdoctoral fellow working with Dr. Randy Schekman at the University of California, Berkeley, Deshaies discovered Sec61, which comprises the heart of the translocon that mediates insertion of secretory and membrane proteins into the endoplasmic reticulum of all eukaryotic cells.  He went on to identify a complex of proteins that form the translocon in yeast cells.  In addition, Deshaies discovered a role for 70 kilodalton heat shock proteins (Hsp70s) in enabling the post-translational insertion of proteins into the endoplasmic reticulum and mitochondrial membranes.  This was the first specific, genetically- and biochemically-validated function to be discovered for a member of the Hsp70 family of proteins.

SCF and cullin–RING ubiquitin ligases:  As a postdoctoral fellow working with Dr. Marc Kirschner at the University of California, San Francisco, Deshaies discovered a biochemical function for the ubiquitin-conjugated enzyme CDC34, which he showed mediates conjugation of ubiquitin onto G1 cyclin proteins in yeast cells.

Upon starting his laboratory at Caltech, Deshaies studied the function of Cdc34 and how it relates to progression through the cell division cycle.  These studies led his laboratory to discover the SCF complex SCFCdc4, which is the progenitor of what is now known to be a large family of ~250 enzymes known as cullin–RING ubiquitin ligases (CRLs) that are conserved throughout eukaryotes and exert a major impact on the regulation of numerous cellular and organismal processes.  In parallel, they established the paradigm of phosphorylation-dependent targeting of SCF substrates.  His lab went on to discover the critical catalytic subunit of SCFCdc4 (known as Rbx1/Roc1/Hrt1) and describe its mechanism of action.  Subsequent studies identified key aspects of CRL mechanism of action.  Particularly notable were their discoveries relating to the CRL regulators COP9 signalosome (CSN) and CAND1.  In 2001-2002, the Deshaies lab showed that CSN, together with proteasome subunit Rpn11/PSMD14, are the founding members of a novel family of deubiquitinating enzymes.  CSN plays a key role in regulating SCF and other CRL enzymes by removing the ubiquitin-like protein NEDD8 from their cullin subunit.  In 2013, they showed that Cand1 has the unusual property of being a ‘protein exchange catalyst’ that equilibrates F-box subunits of SCF ubiquitin ligases with the cullin scaffold subunit.

Proteasome:  The Deshaies group pioneered the use of affinity purification to rapidly purify and characterize the composition of eukaryotic proteasomes, leading to the discovery of a large number of factors, including Rpn13 and Ubp6, that interact with the proteasome in yeast cells.  In subsequent work they discovered that the Rpn11 subunit mediates removal of polyubiquitin chains from proteasome substrates as they are being degraded.

P97/VCP:  Early studies on p97 by the Deshaies group revealed a proteomic interaction network that includes all known UBX domain proteins, as well as a large number of ubiquitin ligase enzymes, including multiple CRLs.  These findings indicated that the biological roles of p97 were far broader than was thought at the time.  This was followed by identifying novel functions for p97, including removal of proteins from chromatin as part of the DNA damage response  and extraction of stalled, nascent polypeptides from the ribosome.

Drug development:  Deshaies, in collaboration with Craig Crews (Yale), conceived the idea of using heterobifunctional small molecules, referred to as PROTACs, to tether cellular proteins to a ubiquitin ligase, resulting in ubiquitination and degradation of the tethered protein.  This concept underlaid the launch of the biotechnology companies Arvinas, C4 Therapeutics, Kymera, Oncopia, and Cullgen.  The Deshaies group also identified small molecules that inhibit targeting of substrates to the proteasome  and removal of ubiquitin chains from substrates by Rpn11.  In addition, they discovered (in collaboration with Dr. Hugh Rosen of Scripps and Frank Schoenen of University of Kansas) the p97 inhibitors DBeQ  and ML240.  ML240 served as the basis for the development of CB-5083, which entered human clinical trials in 2014.

Exit from mitosis:  In addition to their studies on protein degradation, the Deshaies lab worked extensively on cell cycle control from 1994-2005, including studies on the regulation of exit from mitosis.  They established the key paradigm that exit from mitosis is governed by the release of the protein phosphatase Cdc14 from its nucleolar anchor protein Net1 in late anaphase, which is triggered by the action of the mitotic exit network (MEN).  In later work, they established that an early step in the release of Cdc14 from Net1 is the phosphorylation of Net1 by the mitotic cyclin-Cdk complex

Entrepreneurship 
In 2003, Deshaies co-founded Proteolix with Dr. Craig Crews (Yale), Dr. Susan Molineaux, and Dr. Phil Whitcome (deceased), based on technology developed in the Crews and Deshaies labs.  Dr. Lawrence Lasky, of Latterell Venture Partners, also played an instrumental role.  Proteolix built on technology invented by Dr. Crews to develop carfilzomib/Kyprolis® through mid-phase 2 clinical trials before being acquired by Onyx in 2009.  Kyprolis® was approved by the FDA in 2012 for treatment of multiple myeloma, and in 2013 Amgen acquired Onyx.

In 2011, Deshaies co-founded Cleave Biosciences with Dr. Seth Cohen (University of California, San Diego), Dr. Frank Parlati, Dr. Peter Thompson, and Dr. Laura Shawver, based on technology developed in the Cohen and Deshaies labs.  Dr. Lawrence Lasky, this time at US Venture Partners, once again played an instrumental role.  Cleave built on technology invented collaboratively by the Deshaies, Rosen (Scripps), and Schoenen (University of Kansas) laboratories to develop CB-5083, which is a potent and selective inhibitor of p97.  CB-5083 entered human phase 1 clinical trials in 2014.

In May 2017, Deshaies resigned from the California Institute of Technology and Howard Hughes Medical Institute to accept the position of Senior Vice President for discovery research at Amgen. In 2018 he was appointed SVP for global research and is in charge of all research projects up through filing of an IND application.

Awards 
2016 – Elected to the U.S. National Academy of Sciences
2011 – Elected to the American Academy of Arts and Sciences
2007 – Elected as a Fellow of the American Association for the Advancement of Science
1999 – ASCB–Promega Early Career Life Scientist Award
1997 – Beckman Young Investigator Award
1997 – Burroughs-Wellcome New Investigator Award
1995 – Searle Scholar Award
1990 – Lucille P. Markey Charitable Trust Scholar Award

References

External links 
Kyprolis official website. 
Cleave Biosciences.  
Proteome Exploration Laboratory, Caltech. 
The Ubiquitin Proteome System.  Lecture series by Raymond Deshaies, iBiology (video). 

California Institute of Technology faculty
American biochemists
1961 births
People from Waterbury, Connecticut
Living people
University of California, Berkeley alumni
Cornell University alumni